Dimitrios Lantzounis (Meligalas, 1909 – 1991), of Ioannis and Eugenia, was Greek lawyer and politician. He acted as an MP for Messenia for two decades.

References 

People from Messenia
1909 births
1991 deaths
National and Kapodistrian University of Athens alumni
Greek MPs 1950–1951
Greek MPs 1951–1952
Greek MPs 1952–1956
Greek MPs 1956–1958
Greek MPs 1958–1961
Greek MPs 1963–1964
Greek MPs 1964–1967